Truman Ward Ingersoll (February 19, 1862 – June 9, 1922) was a photographer in the United States. He is known for the stereoviews he published in the U.S. and other areas. His work included many images of sights in Yellowstone National Park as well as hunting scenes and architectural features. In the early 20th century he also produced half-tone lithoviews. His company was named Ingersoll View Company.

The Met has one of his building photographs in their collection and the Getty Museum has a collection of his work.

Ingersoll was born to  Daniel Wesley and Marion Ward Ingersoll in St. Paul, Minnesota.

The Library of Congress also has a collection of his work.

Ingersoll is buried at Oakland Cemetery in St. Paul.

See also
Benjamin Franklin Upton

References

External links

1862 births
1922 deaths
19th-century American photographers
20th-century American photographers